Kuma Lisa (Macedonian and  or Godmother Fox translated literally into English) or Lisa Patrikeyevna (meaning Fox Patrikas's-daughter, named after prince Patrikas, who was known as a very sly politician) or Lisichka-sestrichka ( which means Fox-sister) is a character who is a fox from Macedonian, Bulgarian and Ukrainian folklore. She usually plays the role of the trickster, as an archetype. Many folk tales as well as authored works use the character of Kuma Lisa. In many tales Kuma Lisa is encountered with another character known as Kumcho Vulcho - a wolf which is opposite to her and very often suffers from her tricks.

References

Fairy tale stock characters
Russian folklore characters
Bulgarian folklore
Literature featuring anthropomorphic foxes
Female characters in literature
Fictional shapeshifters
Shapeshifting
Fictional foxes
North Macedonia folklore